The urbanization of the United States has progressed throughout its entire history. Over the last two centuries, the United States of America has been transformed from a predominantly rural, agricultural nation into an urbanized, industrial one. This was largely due to the Industrial Revolution in the United States (and parts of Western Europe) in the late 18th and early 19th centuries and the rapid industrialization which the United States experienced as a result. In 1790, only about one out of every twenty Americans (on average) lived in urban areas (cities), but this ratio had dramatically changed to one out of four by 1870, one out of two by 1920, two out of three in the 1960s, and four out of five in the 2000s.

Urbanization
The urbanization of the United States occurred over a period of many years, with the nation only attaining urban-majority status between 1910 and 1920. Currently, over four-fifths of the U.S. population resides in urban areas, a percentage which is still increasing today. The United States Census Bureau changed its classification and definition of urban areas in 1950 and again in 1990, and caution is thus advised when comparing urban data from different time periods.

Urbanization was fastest in the Northeastern United States, which acquired an urban majority by 1880. Some Northeastern U.S. states had already acquired an urban majority before then, including Massachusetts and Rhode Island (majority-urban by 1850), and New York (majority-urban since about 1870). The Midwestern and Western United States became urban majority in the 1910s, while the Southern United States only became urban-majority after World War II, in the 1950s.

The Western U.S. is the most urbanized part of the country today, followed closely by the Northeastern United States. The Southern U.S. experienced rapid industrialization after World War II, and is now over three-quarters urban, having almost the same urban percentage in 2010 as the Midwestern United States. Just four U.S. states (out of fifty) have a rural majority today, and even some of these states (such as Mississippi) are continuing to urbanize. Some U.S. states currently have an urban percentage around or above 90%, an urbanization rate almost unheard of a century ago.

The state of Maine (and Vermont, to a lesser degree) has bucked the trend towards greater urbanization which is exhibited throughout the rest of the United States. Maine's highest urban percentage ever was less than 52% (in 1950), and today less than 39% of the state's population resides in urban areas. Maine is currently the least urban U.S. state; its urban percentage (39%) is less than half of the United States average (81%). Maine was less urban than the United States average in every U.S. census since the first one in 1790.

Historical statistics
The data in this table/section are all from the U.S. Census Bureau. Note that the definition of urban population has changed over time. New definitions were used for the Censuses conducted for 1900, 1950, 2000, and 2020.

aThis datum is from 1899 instead of from 1900.

See also
Borchert's Epochs
Demographics of the United States
Largest cities in the United States by population by decade
List of United States cities
List of United States cities by area
List of United States cities by population
 :Category:Timelines of cities in the United States

References

Society of the United States
Economy of the United States
Geography of the United States
Urban development
Urban planning in the United States
United States